Andrzej Zawieja (born 5 July 1940) is a Polish sailor. He competed in the Finn event at the 1968 Summer Olympics.

References

External links
 

1940 births
Living people
Polish male sailors (sport)
Olympic sailors of Poland
Sailors at the 1968 Summer Olympics – Finn
Sportspeople from Kalisz